Sickman may refer to:

Laurence Sickman, American historian of Chinese art
Sickman, a song on Dirt (Alice in Chains album)